Balaram Gharti Magar is a political leader of Nepal. He became minister 11 times in the past, during Panchayat System, and after the declaration of multi-party system. Roughly, he remained in different governments as a minister for about 30 years in the past. He is a Central Committee Member, Senior Member, of Rastriya Prajatantra Party (RPP). He is still actively taking part in his party activities. He has been visiting his birthplace, Rolpa, and Rolpali people time to time.

Family
He was born at Mijhing VDC, Ward No 5, Upallothar Mukhyadera, Rolpa District in Nepal on 18 Shravan 1994 BS. His parents were Nar Bahadur Gharti Magar and Tika Kumari Gharti Magar. He has two brothers and one younger sister, KrishnakalaHe lost his mother when he was 15 years old. When he was 16 years of age, due to his grandfather's suggestion and request, he married Belmati (Ramjali) Gharti Magar of Mijhing VDC, Ward No 7, Maldhara. He has seven daughters and resides at Satdobato, Lalitpur Sub-Metropolitan city permanently. He did not get any formal opportunity to study as present day children do get due to his family background, he got education at home from his father and grandfather. Later he got opportunity to study informally in Kanpur, India.

Early politics
In 2017 BS, he went to Kanpur where he spent a year. He was influenced by political activities there. Although political activities in Nepal were banned, in India it was free to open different unions. Every day after hearing the speeches from the Union leaders there, he learnt the methods of conducting speeches and dealing with the political masses. He returned to Rolpa in 2018 BS and met resident of Gajul VDC, Khadananda Subedi. He was Nepali Congress party leader of Rolpa and was Member of Parliament (MP) during the Nepali Congress-led Government. Subedi advised him to take active participation in politics. Gharti Magar was influenced by Nepali Congress party during that time.

Later politics
During the election of Pradhanpancha, he was elected as a Pradhanpancha of his village in 2018 BS. He was 24 years old when he became Pradhanpancha for the first time. The next year, there was District Panchayat's election, he got elected as a Upasabhapati of District Panchayat. National Panchayat Member (NPM) election was held in the same year and he was elected without any opposition. In Baishakh 2020 BS, meeting of National Panchayat was held formally. One of his well wishers, knowing he was so young, had suggested him not to be a minister because that post would have destroyed him. He was only 25 years of age at that time. The third election was held in Chaitra 2030 BS and he was reelected in NPM and in the meantime, he became Assistant Minister of Home Affairs for the first time. He was 37 years old at that time. Later he became Defence State Minister. After one year, he became Construction and Transport State Minister in 2035 BS under the premiership of Dr Tulshi Giri. In 2034 BS, when Kirti Nidhi Bista became Prime Minister (PM), he became Construction and Transport Minister. Later when Surya Bahadur Thapa became PM, he became Defence Minister. There was another election in 2038 BS, he was again reelected with huge majority of votes, with about 28,000. After becoming Defence Minister for one year, he became Local Development Minister. After one year, he became Industry Minister. Meantime, he became Health Minister too. In 2040 BS, he remained only NPM during the premiership of Lokendra Bahadur Chand. There was another election during 2043 BS, he was reelected in NPM.

After the multiparty democracy in Nepal, in 2051BS, he was elected as Member of Parliament (MP) from RPP. When Surya Bahadur Thapa became PM, he was appointed as Construction and Transport Minister. Later when Sher Bahadur Deuba became PM, he became Housing and Physical Planning Minister. Later again when Sher Bahadur Deuba became PM, he became Science and Technology Minister for the last time.

Works
He has published five books: Mool, Rajyog Sadhana Sutra, Yesterday, Today and Tomorrow, Sandhi Patra Grantha, and Yogi Narharinath Sangraha. He has just published his autobiography "Aitihasik Ghatanakram Part 1" in which he has compiled his experience in Nepalese politics.

Awards
He is awarded with Gorkha Dakshin Bahu First and Second Class, Trishakti Patta Second Class, Shubharajyavishek Padak, Birendra Aishwarya Sewa Padak, Sewa Padak, and Coronation Medal.

See also
 Magar people

References

Living people
People from Rolpa District
Nepali Congress politicians from Lumbini Province
Government ministers of Nepal
Rastriya Prajatantra Party politicians
Year of birth missing (living people)
Nepal MPs 1994–1999
Members of the Rastriya Panchayat
Members of the National Assembly (Nepal)